Clorinda or Clorinde may refer to:

People:
 Clorinda Corradi (1804–1877), noted Italian opera contralto
Clorinda Málaga de Prado (1905–1993), First Lady of Peru
 Clorinda Matto de Turner (1852–1909), Peruvian writer

In the arts:
 Clorinda (Jerusalem Delivered), a character in the 1581 epic poem Jerusalem Delivered by Torquato Tasso, often depicted in art and music
 Clorinda, one of the protagonists in Il combattimento di Tancredi e Clorinda, a 1624 operatic scena based on Tasso
 Clorinda, Robin Hood's bride in the 1716 ballad "Robin Hood's Birth, Breeding, Valor, and Marriage"
 Clorinda, an 1811 portrait painting by Thomas Douglas Guest
 Clorinda, a character in the 1817 opera La Cenerentola by Gioachino Rossini
 Clorinda, a main character in the 1863 one-act opérette Il signor Fagotto, by Jacques Offenbach

Vessels:
 French frigate Clorinde (1801), a 44-gun Uranie class frigate of the French Navy
 French frigate Clorinde (1808), a 40-gun Pallas-class frigate of the French Navy

Other uses:
 Clorinda (brachiopod), a brachiopod genus
 Clorinda, Formosa, a city in Argentina
 282 Clorinde, an asteroid

See also
 Clarinda (disambiguation)